Barton was a railway station in the village of Barton, Lancashire, on the Liverpool, Southport and Preston Junction Railway. Situated to the south of the roadbridge on Station Road (off the A5147), the station opened on 1 November 1887, and was renamed Downholland on 2 June 1924.  Downholland largely served as the terminus for trains coming from Southport (initially , then  from 1901), though through trains to  operated until 1926.  The Barton Branch was notable for the "Altcar Bob" service, introduced in July 1906.

The station closed to passengers on 26 September 1938, though the line remained open for goods traffic until 21 January 1952.  The tracks were lifted shortly thereafter.  The site now lies within the boundaries of a local nature reserve, and the heavily overgrown platforms can still be seen.

References

External links 
 Downholland at Disused Stations

Disused railway stations in the Borough of West Lancashire
Former Lancashire and Yorkshire Railway stations
Railway stations in Great Britain opened in 1887
Railway stations in Great Britain closed in 1938